The Ravenite Social Club was an Italian American heritage club at 247 Mulberry Street, in Little Italy, New York City. It was used as a mob hangout and the storefront later became a shoe store, and as of 2022 is a men's clothing store.

History
The club was founded in 1926 first as the Alto Knights Social Club (after an old street gang during Prohibition), and later became a hangout for Charlie Luciano and others. The Alto Knights name was derived from the Order of Saint James of Altopascio. In 1957 when Carlo Gambino took over, he renamed the club "The Ravenite" in honor of his favorite poem by Edgar Allan Poe, "The Raven". But Gambino stopped habituating the club when he discovered police had a growing interest in surveillance of the club. It then became under the management of Aniello Dellacroce. It was frequented and used as the headquarters of the Gambino crime family in the late 1970s and 1980s. Around 1990, the Federal Bureau of Investigation was able to infiltrate the Mafia using secret electronic surveillance, because John Gotti used an apartment above the Ravenite; the FBI subsequently sent agents to install voice recorders and other wiretaps inside the apartment. The FBI then used recordings from secret Mafia meetings in that apartment against Gotti. Exterior surveillance also recorded numerous union officials outside the Ravenite, helping the FBI in connecting the boss of the Gambino crime family to the city's labor unions.

References

Clubs and societies in Manhattan
Gambino crime family

Nolita